Drăgușeni is a commune in Galați County, Western Moldavia, Romania with a population of 5,255 people. It is composed of seven villages: Adam, Căuiești, Drăgușeni, Fundeanu, Ghinghești, Nicopole and Știețești.

References

Communes in Galați County
Localities in Western Moldavia